Johannes Cornelis Gerrit Göckel (28 December 1886 in Amsterdam – 6 June 1960 in Amsterdam) was a Dutch gymnast who competed in the 1908 Summer Olympics. He was part of the Dutch gymnastics team, which finished seventh in the team event.

References

External links
 

1886 births
1960 deaths
Dutch male artistic gymnasts
Gymnasts at the 1908 Summer Olympics
Olympic gymnasts of the Netherlands
Gymnasts from Amsterdam